Gaston H. Gonnet is a Uruguayan Canadian computer scientist and entrepreneur.  He is best known for his contributions to the Maple computer algebra system and the creation of a digital version of the Oxford English Dictionary.

Education and early life 
Gonnet received his doctorate in computer science from the University of Waterloo in 1977.  His thesis was entitled Interpolation and Interpolation-Hash Searching.  His advisor was J. Alan George.

Career and research
In 1980 Gonnet co-founded the Symbolic Computation Group at the University of Waterloo.  The work of SCG on a general-purpose computer algebra system later formed the core of the Maple system.  In 1988, Gonnet co-founded (with Keith Geddes) the private company Waterloo Maple Inc., to sell Maple commercially.  In the mid 1990s the company ran into trouble and a disagreement between his colleagues caused him to withdraw from chairman of the Board and managerial involvement.

In 1984 Gonnet co-founded the New Oxford English Dictionary project at UW, which sought to create a searchable electronic version of the Oxford English Dictionary. The project was selected by the Oxford University Press as a partner for the computerisation leading to the publication of the second edition of the OED. The UW project's main contributions were in the parsing of the source text to enhance the tagging and on building a full text searching system based on PAT trees (a version of suffix array). This project later culminated in another successful commercial venture, the Open Text Corporation.  Gonnet was founder and chairman of the Board of OTC until 1994.

Gonnet is a computer science professor at ETH Zurich in Zurich, Switzerland. In 1991, he began developing the Darwin programming language for biosciences, which would become the basis for OMA,  a package and database for gene orthology prediction. He is chief scientist of two Canadian startups: CeeqIT and Porfiau.

Awards and honours
On June 9, 2011, Gonnet and Keith O. Geddes received the ACM Richard D. Jenks Memorial Prize for Excellence in Software Engineering Applied to Computer Algebra for the Maple Project.

On March 14, 2013 Gonnet was awarded a Dr. Honoris Causa by the Universidad de la República, engineering faculty from Uruguay.

See also
 List of University of Waterloo people

References

Living people
Scientific computing researchers
Swiss computer scientists
University of Waterloo alumni
Uruguayan computer scientists
Uruguayan expatriates in Canada
Uruguayan expatriates in Switzerland
Uruguayan people of French descent
Place of birth missing (living people)
1948 births